The IIFA Award for Best Music Director is chosen by the viewers and the winner is announced at the actual ceremony.

Superlatives

List of winners
A.R. Rahman (8 wins) is the most awarded artist, followed by Amaal Mallik (4), Shankar–Ehsaan–Loy (3) and Pritam (3). Anu Malik is the artist with most nominations (7) without a win.

The winners are listed below:

See also 
 IIFA Awards
 Bollywood
 Cinema of India

External links 
Official website (archived)

International Indian Film Academy Awards